The Sulawesi forest turtle (Leucocephalon yuwonoi) is a critically endangered species of turtle in the family Geoemydidae. The species is monotypic within the genus Leucocephalon. It is endemic to Sulawesi in Indonesia.

Etymology
The specific name, yuwonoi, is in honor of Indonesian herpetologist Frank Bambang Yuwono (born 1958).

Habitat
The preferred natural habitats of L. yuwonoi are freshwater swamps and rivers.

Conservation
As of 2016 The Riverview Zoo in Peterborough, Ontario, had managed to hatch two Sulawesi forest turtles.

See also
Forsten's tortoise (Indotestudo forstenii) – another threatened turtle endemic to Sulawesi, Indonesia.

References

Further reading
Artner H (2008). "The world's extant turtle species, Part 1". Emys 15 (3): 4–32. (Notochelys yuwonoi, new combination, p. 10).
Fritz U, Obst FJ (1996). "Zur Kenntnis der Celebes-Erdschildkröte, Heosemys yuwonoi (McCord, Iverson & Boeadi, 1995)". Herpetofauna 18 (102): 27–34. (Heosemys yuwonoi, new combination). (in German).
McCord WP, Iverson JB, Boeadi [B] (1995). "A New Batagurid Turtle from Northern Sulawesi, Indonesia". Chelonian Conservation and Biology 1 (4): 311–316. (Geoemyda yuwonoi, new species).
McCord WP, Iverson JB, Spinks, Shaffer HB (2000). "A new genus of geoemydid turtle from Asia". Hamadryad 25 (2): 20–24. (Leucocephalon, new genus; L. yuwonoi, new combination).

Geoemydidae
Reptiles of Indonesia
Reptiles described in 1995
Taxonomy articles created by Polbot